The Iowa Auditor of State is the state auditor of the Government of Iowa, United States. The office's mission is to "serve as the taxpayers' watchdog" by "ensuring that government officials use taxpayer dollars for the intended purposes to benefit the public".

The office is provided for by the Constitution of Iowa, which requires that the auditor be elected every four years, simultaneously with the rest of the state's executive branch, in midterm elections. The auditor is required to make a complete audit of the financial accounts of every department of the Government of Iowa annually. The office supervised by the Auditor of State includes three divisions: Administration, Financial Audit, and Performance Investigation.

List of auditors

References